Jean Albert De Schryver (born 7 March 1916, date of death unknown) was a Belgian boxer who competed in the 1936 Summer Olympics. In 1936 he was eliminated in the second round of the middleweight class after losing his fight to Henryk Chmielewski.

External links
 Jean De Schryver's profile at Sports Reference.com

1916 births
Year of death missing
Middleweight boxers
Olympic boxers of Belgium
Boxers at the 1936 Summer Olympics
Belgian male boxers